Ronald José Acuña Blanco Jr. (born December 18, 1997) is a Venezuelan professional baseball outfielder for the Atlanta Braves of Major League Baseball (MLB). After signing with the Braves as an international free agent in 2014, Acuña made his MLB debut in 2018, and won the National League Rookie of the Year Award. The next season, Acuña was named an MLB All-Star, was the NL stolen base leader, and won a Silver Slugger Award.

Career

Minor leagues
Acuña signed with the Atlanta Braves for $100,000 as an international free agent in July 2014. He made his professional debut in 2015 with the Gulf Coast Braves and was later promoted to the Danville Braves that season. In 55 games between the two teams he batted .269 with four home runs, 18 RBIs, and 16 stolen bases.

In 2016, he slashed .312/.392/.429 with four home runs and 19 RBIs in only 42 games combined between the Gulf Coast Braves and Rome Braves due to an injury. After the season, he played for the Melbourne Aces of the Australian Baseball League and was named an ABL All-Star. Acuña made his first appearances in Grapefruit League games at the start of the 2017 season as an extra player originally assigned to minor league camp. He began the year with the Florida Fire Frogs of the Class A-Advanced Florida State League and was later promoted to the Mississippi Braves of the Class AA Southern League. Acuña was named to the All-Star Futures Game roster in July, and played the whole game, one of three World Team members to do so. He reported to the Gwinnett Braves of the Class AAA International League immediately after the All-Star break, making his International League debut against the Charlotte Knights, during which he hit an opposite-field home run in his second at bat. For the year, Acuña appeared in 139 games, hitting .325/.374/.522 with 21 homers, 82 RBIs and 44 stolen bases.

After the 2017 minor league regular season ended, Acuña was invited to join the Arizona Fall League and was assigned to the Peoria Javelinas. He played 23 games in the AFL hitting .325/.414/.639 alongside seven home runs, winning the league championship and claiming league MVP honors, becoming the AFL's youngest most valuable player.

Baseball America ranked Acuña as the No. 1 Major League Baseball prospect heading into the 2018 season. MLB.com ranked him second to Japanese pitcher/hitter Shohei Ohtani. Acuña began the year at major league spring training. Despite a .432 average and four home runs in spring training, Acuña was reassigned to minor league camp on March 19, 2018. He reported to the Gwinnett Stripers to begin the 2018 season.

Atlanta Braves

2018
On April 25, 2018, the Braves promoted Acuña to the major leagues. This made him the youngest player in Major League Baseball at that time, claiming the distinction from teammate Ozzie Albies. Though Acuña wore uniform number 24 throughout his minor league career in honor of Miguel Cabrera, he made his major league debut on April 25, 2018, wearing number 13. Against the Cincinnati Reds, Acuña collected his first career hit off Kevin Shackelford. He finished the game 1 for 5 and scored the game-tying run in the eighth inning as the Braves won 5–4. The next day, also against the Reds, Acuña hit his first MLB home run off Homer Bailey. He finished the game 3 for 4 as the Braves won 7–4. On May 28, Acuña was placed on the 10-day disabled list due to a mild ACL sprain and a bruise in his left knee as well as back contusion. On June 21, the Braves optioned Acuña to Triple-A Gwinnett for a rehab assignment.

Acuña regularly hit in the leadoff spot in the lineup after the All-Star break. His performance improved markedly as he implemented an adjustment to his batting stance at the suggestion of Kevin Seitzer. While playing against the Miami Marlins on August 13, 2018, Acuña became the fourth player in the history of Major League Baseball to hit a home run to lead off both games of a doubleheader. Additionally, he had hit a home run in his last four games, becoming the youngest player since 1920 to accomplish the feat. By hitting a home run off Trevor Richards on August 14, Acuña became the youngest major leaguer ever to hit home runs in five consecutive games, as well as the fifth batter in Atlanta Braves history to do so. Facing Adam Conley later that same game, Acuña hit his second home run of the night, marking the first time he had ever hit more than one home run in a game.

In the finale of the Braves' series against the Marlins on August 15, Acuña faced José Ureña, who hit him with the first pitch of the game. Ureña was ejected from the game, while Acuña was replaced in the field at the top of the second inning. Acuña played the Braves' next game against the Colorado Rockies on August 16. When Acuña next played the Marlins on August 23, he hit another home run, and was subsequently struck by another pitch. His production during the month of August won him the Major League Baseball Rookie of the Month Award. On September 2, Acuña hit his seventh leadoff home run, tying a Braves team record, set by Marquis Grissom, for such home runs in a season. Three days later, Acuña broke the team's leadoff home run record in a game against the Boston Red Sox. With his 25th home run on September 9, Acuña became the seventh player in MLB history to hit that many home runs while under the age of 21. Later that month, it was announced that Acuña would be playing in the MLB Japan All-Star Series scheduled for November. With his fifteenth stolen base on September 22, 2018, Acuña became the fourth player in MLB history to record a 25–15 season, while aged 20 or below, alongside Alex Rodriguez, Orlando Cepeda, and Mike Trout. Overall with the 2018 Braves, Acuña appeared in 111 MLB games, batting .293 with 26 home runs and 64 RBIs.

On October 7, in a National League Division Series game against the Los Angeles Dodgers, Acuña became the youngest player in MLB history to hit a postseason grand slam, aged 20 years 293 days, off Dodgers pitcher Walker Buehler. On November 12, he was named the National League Rookie of the Year.

2019
On April 2, 2019, Acuña and the Braves agreed to an eight-year contract worth $100 million. The extension included team options for the 2027 and 2028 seasons. Aged 21, Acuña became the youngest player in baseball history to sign a contract worth at least $100 million. Acuña's deal was the largest for any player with less than one year of major league service. By June 2019, Acuña had drawn attention for his power production. At midseason, he was named a starting outfielder for the National League in the 2019 Major League Baseball All-Star Game, and invited to take part in that year's Home Run Derby.

On August 9, Acuña hit his thirtieth home run of the 2019 season while facing Marlins pitcher Tayron Guerrero. Acuña joined the 30–30 club on August 24, in a game against the New York Mets. He became the second-youngest player to reach the milestone, after Mike Trout. With his fortieth home run on September 19, Acuña became the youngest major leaguer to enter the 40–30 club. He reported a minor injury in the penultimate series of the Braves' 2019 season, and was rested for the remainder of the regular season.

For the year, Acuña hit .280/.365/.518/.883, with 127 runs (leading the National League), 41 home runs, and 37 stolen bases (leading the NL). Acuña missed the 40–40 club by three stolen bases. He led the major leagues in power-speed number (38.9). Acuña and teammates Ozzie Albies and Freddie Freeman won the 2019 National League Silver Slugger Awards for outfield, second base, and first base, respectively.

2020

During a season shortened by the COVID-19 pandemic, the Braves won the division for the third time in a row, earning a league-record 20th division title. Near the end of the season, Acuña hit a 495-foot home run against the Red Sox; it was the longest MLB home run that year and the longest home run ever hit at Truist Park. In 2020, he batted .250/.406/.581, with 14 home runs and 29 RBIs in 160 at bats and led the league in at bats per home run. He was awarded his second consecutive Silver Slugger Award and finished in twelfth place in voting for the Most Valuable Player Award.

2021
On May 3, Acuña was named National League Player of the Month for April, batting .341/.443/.705 with eight home runs, three stolen bases, 18 RBIs, and 25 runs scored in 24 games. On May 19, Acuña hit his first career walk-off home run against the New York Mets to give the Braves a 5–4 win.

On July 10, 2021, Acuña suffered a leg injury while trying to field a fly ball and was taken off the field on a motorized stretcher. An MRI showed a complete tear in his right anterior cruciate ligament, which prematurely ended his 2021 season. In 82 games, Acuña hit .283/.394/.596 with 24 home runs, 52 RBIs and 17 stolen bases in 2021. In 2021, he had the fastest sprint speed of all major league right fielders, at 29.4 feet/second. He led the major leagues with 72 runs scored at the time of his injury. Acuña was elected to start the 2021 All-Star Game alongside teammates Freddie Freeman and Ozzie Albies but was unable to participate due to the injury. Despite Acuña's injury, the Braves went on to win the 2021 World Series.

2022
Acuña did not participate in spring training games, as rehabilitation from his leg injury continued into the 2022 season. Acuña remained at the Braves' spring training facility and played in simulated games until being assigned to the Gwinnett Stripers during the third week of April. He was activated from the injured list on April 27. Acuña received the most votes of any National League player and was duly selected as a starting outfielder for the 2022 Major League Baseball All-Star Game. On July 11, 2022, it was announced that Acuña would participate in the 2022 Home Run Derby. Acuña finished the season batting .266/.351/.413 with 15 home runs, 50 RBIs and 29 stolen bases in 119 games. He led the National League with 11 times caught stealing.

Player profile

Batting style 
A powerful right-handed batter, Acuña has all round batting range. Former major league hitter Sean Casey compared Acuña's batting style to Roberto Clemente, as his natural core power and rotational torque allows him to hit without a backswing, and keeping the knob of the bat pointing down at home plate (normally pointing towards the catcher during the backswing), yet still making contact and maintaining control of the barrel.

Baserunning 
On the basepaths, Acuña starts off like an infielder with a more upright stance, or a running back standing with a slight bend of the knees and hands on the knees to generate greater acceleration. According to Harold Reynolds, who adopted the Rickey Henderson technique for both baserunning and fielding, the stance also stops him from leaning or tipping off fielders for base stealing.

Personal life
Acuña's grandfather, Romualdo Blanco, and father, Ronald Acuña Sr., both played minor league baseball. Acuña Sr. represented Venezuela at the 2011 Pan American Games. Acuña Jr. is the eldest of four sons. A younger brother, Luisangel, is a shortstop in the Texas Rangers organization. An uncle, José Escobar, played for the Cleveland Indians in 1991, and several cousins have also played in Major League Baseball, namely Vicente Campos, Alcides Escobar, Edwin Escobar, and Kelvim Escobar. His son was born in 2020.

See also

 Atlanta Braves award winners and league leaders
 List of Major League Baseball annual runs scored leaders
 List of Major League Baseball players from Venezuela

References

External links

, or Venezuelan Winter League website

1997 births
Living people
Atlanta Braves players
Danville Braves players
Florida Fire Frogs players
Gulf Coast Braves players
Gwinnett Braves players
Gwinnett Stripers players
Luis Aparicio Award winners
Major League Baseball left fielders
Major League Baseball players from Venezuela
Major League Baseball Rookie of the Year Award winners
Melbourne Aces players
Mississippi Braves players
National League All-Stars
National League stolen base champions
People from La Guaira
Peoria Javelinas players
Rome Braves players
Silver Slugger Award winners
Tiburones de La Guaira players
Venezuelan expatriate baseball players in the United States
Venezuelan expatriate baseball players in Australia
2023 World Baseball Classic players